Tristan C. Anderson is a BAFTA award winning  filmmaker  and musician based in London, England. He has made films for the BBC, Channel 4, The Guardian, London Live, and on the Emmy Award winning Current TV. His music has been featured on the BBC & Current TV.

Tristan is also one of the founders (with Katharine Round) of 'DocHeads', a dedicated documentary screening, networking, and funding organization that promotes the work of documentary filmmakers.

He is the creator of the term Pop Doc. An experimental new genre of music video-cum-documentary bridging the conventions of each, where song acts as score and/or documentary becomes visuals. He showcased this genre from his recent #Soundtracks project, https://www.soundtracks-project.com/ the world’s first music video documentary album consisting of 8 songs with 8 films.

Filmography

 The Three Michaels (2022) - Producer - Feature documentary 
 A Divorce Before Marriage (2016) - Co-Producer - Feature documentary 
 My F**ked Brain  (2016) - Channel 4 / All 4
 What Is Art?  (2016) BBC Bitesize
 Faith in the Aerosol (2015)  - StoryHunter   
 Extreme Unicycling (2015) - Channel 4 / All 4
 His City His Story (2015) - StoryHunter
 Double Vision (2014)  - Channel 4 / All 4
 Right to Run (2014) - The Guardian Online  *Co-Director
 Anti-Social Worker (2014) - London Live  
 Drug Stories (2014) - BBC Two
 Forgive or Forget (2014) - The Guardian Online
 Soft Bullets (2013) - London Short Film Festival
 Just a Few Drinks (2012) - BBC Two
 The Sound of Change (2012) - Community Channel
 Badges of Convenience (2012) Channel 4 **Co-director
 What Did I Do Last Night? : Series 1 & 2 - (2011 - 2012) - Current TV
 The Day My Face Changed (2009) - Current TV
 Why Am I Going Grey?  (2009) - Current TV
 The Dark Side Of Fame (2009) - Current TV
 Sexy Girls Have It Easy (2008) - Current TV
 My Drunken Shame (2008) - Current TV
 Cocaine Nightmare (2008) - Current TV
 Free Fall: Dive of Dave (2008) - Current TV

Discography
Albums

2005 - Modern Sign Language (as Moon Junior)

2008 - ArtWars (as ArtWars)

2013 - Revolutions (as ArtWars)

2014 - Digital Church (as ArtWars)

2015 - Islands (as ArtWars)

2016 - No Hands (as ArtWars)

2018 - Tristan C Anderson - #Soundtracks
 
2021 - Tristan C Anderson - Heavy Meditation

References

External links
 

British filmmakers
Living people
Film producers from London
Film directors from London
Year of birth missing (living people)